Old Colfeians Rugby Football Club is an English rugby union team based in Lee in south London, open to anyone interested in the game! The club runs three senior teams and a veterans side and a full range of junior and girls teams, each of which have their own name.  The first XV plays in London 2 South East, having been relegated from London 1 South at the end of the 2017–18 season.

History
Old Colfeians was formed in 1928 but the club traces its routes back to 1885 when a club for the former pupils of Colfe's School got together to play rugby. For the next 60 years, Old Colfeians mostly played non-competitive matches against local rugby clubs. This ended when league rugby began in 1987 when the club was originally placed in London 3 South East and were promoted to London 2 South in 1989 and then, two years later were promoted to London 1 as champions. In 2000 the club gained another promotion and moved into National League 3 South, the fourth tier of English rugby, and remained there for three seasons. The club was relegated in 2004 and again in 2009 and they currently play in the London 2 South East league.

Old Colfeians also played in the EDF National Trophy.  However, in 2008 they were eliminated in the first round by the Tribute Western Counties West team, the Wadebridge Camels from Cornwall.

On Saturday, 22 April 2017, Old Colfeians beat Camberley 17–20 to gain promotion to London 1 South

Clubhouse 
Old Colfeians' ground contains a clubhouse with a war memorial with the names of former players and pupils of Colfe's School who had died in the First and Second World Wars inside it. The clubhouse is also used by Colfe's School as the location of their annual remembrance service.

Club honours
London Division 1 champions: 2000-01
London 2 South champions: 1991-92
London 2 South East champions: 2021-22
London 3 South East champions: 1988–89
Kent Cup winners (2): 1992, 1994
Kent Shield winners: 2022
Kent Plate winners: 1997
London 2 (south-east v south-west) promotion playoff winners: 2016-17

References

External links
Official club website

Rugby clubs established in 1928
English rugby union teams
Rugby union clubs in London
1928 establishments in England